Mike Esposito may refer to:

 Mike Esposito (comics) (1927–2010), comic book artist, writer and publisher
 Mike Esposito, lead guitarist for the rock music group Blues Magoos
 Mike Esposito (baseball) (born 1981), pitcher for the Colorado Rockies
 Mike Esposito (American football) (born 1953), running back for the Atlanta Falcons

See also
Michael Esposito (disambiguation)